Harry Rabinowitz MBE (26 March 1916 – 22 June 2016) was a South African-British conductor and composer of film and television music. Born in Johannesburg, South Africa, he was the son of Israel and Eva Rabinowitz. He was educated at the University of the Witwatersrand and at London's Guildhall School of Music and Drama.

Career
Rabinowitz's musical career began as a six-week stint playing sheet music for potential customers in a Johannesburg department store. His first job conducting an orchestra was for a show called Strike a New Note in 1945, using a rolled-up newspaper as a baton. Rabinowitz left Johannesburg for England in 1946 to study conducting.

He was conductor of the BBC Revue Orchestra (1953–60), music director for BBC Television Light Entertainment (1960–68), and head of music for London Weekend Television (1968–77). He conducted at the Hollywood Bowl (1983–84) and the Boston Pops Orchestra (1985–92) and with the London Symphony Orchestra and the Royal Philharmonic Orchestra. He was the conductor at the Orchestra of St. Luke's Ismail Merchant and James Ivory 35th anniversary celebration at Carnegie Hall on 17 September 1996.

Rabinowitz conducted the film scores for numerous films including Hanover Street (1979), Chariots of Fire (1981), Heat and Dust (1983), The Bostonians (1984), Return to Oz (1985), Lady Jane (1986), Maurice (1987), The Remains of the Day (1993), The English Patient (1996), The Talented Mr. Ripley (1999), and Cold Mountain (2003). Additionally he has an uncredited cue in the science fiction/horror movie Aliens (1986) during the combat drop sequence that replaced James Horner's cue "Combat Drop" which he had recorded with the London Symphony Orchestra.  Rabinowitz also composed music for television including The Frost Report (1966), I, Claudius (1976) and The Agatha Christie Hour (1982). Although he was credited for Reilly, Ace of Spies (1983), Rabinowitz was not the composer of the opening score, which was the ‘’Romance’’ composed by Dmitri Shostakovich for the movie The Gadfly.

In June 2015, Rabinowitz was the guest castaway on BBC Radio 4's Desert Island Discs.

Personal life
Rabinowitz was married twice. On 15 December 1944; his first wife was Lorna Thurlow Anderson. The couple divorced in 2000. On 18 March 2001, he wed Mary (Mitzi) C. Scott. He has three children: daughters Karen Lesley (born 1947) and Lisa Gabrielle (born 1960) and son Simon Oliver (born 1951). He lived in Portland, Oregon, from November through March and the rest of the year in Provence.

Rabinowitz reached 100 years of age on 26 March 2016. He died on 22 June 2016 at his home in Lacoste, Vaucluse, France. Rabinowitz continued to play the piano every day until his death.

References

Other sources
 Debrett's People of Today. Debrett's Peerage Ltd, 2008.
 Marquis Who's Who, 2008.
 Strauss, Neil, "Lush Odes to the Art of Two Film Makers", in The New York Times, 19 September 1996, p. C16.

External links

Q&A with Harry Rabinowitz 
MBE Listings
Obituary – BBC
Obituary with death date  – London Symphony Orchestra

1916 births
2016 deaths
British centenarians
Members of the Order of the British Empire
Eurovision Song Contest conductors
British film score composers
British male film score composers
British Jews
People from Johannesburg
Musicians from Portland, Oregon
Jingle composers
Men centenarians
South African emigrants to the United Kingdom